Thomea is a genus of air-breathing land snails, terrestrial gastropod mollusks in the family Achatinidae.

Species
Species within the genus Thomea include:
 Thomea newtoni

References

 Nomenclator Zoologicus info

 
Taxonomy articles created by Polbot